was a Japanese comedian and film actor, and leader of the comedy group The Drifters.

Life and career

1931–1962: Childhood and early career
Chōsuke Ikariya was born with the name  on November 1, 1931 in Tokyo, Japan. During the war his family moved from their home in Sumida, Tokyo to the countryside in Shizuoka. There he took up a job as a factory worker as a young man. He also took up playing the double bass, a hint at his performer nature. He got rather good, too, performing in brass bands until he got a regular job with the "Jimmie Tokita & His Mountain Playboys." It was a band that specialised in playing at G.I. bases at the time and had guitarist Takeshi Terauchi. However, during that time in his life he was one of the tallest members of the band, so he stood out. The audience often singled him out for never smiling, picking on him for amusement.

1962–1969: The Drifters
In 1962, Ikariya joined The Drifters, an aspiring pop band that featured comedy routines in its performances of rock and roll music. Members joined and quit the band over the next two years until Ikariya, still persisting, became the leader of the five-member group. The band was able to scrape by though appearing on television afterwards, with Ikariya writing most of the material for the performances.

In 1966, The Drifters opened for The Beatles at the Nippon Budokan Hall in Tokyo, although apparently Ikariya didn't see it as much of an accomplishment as opposed to just another job.

1969–1985: Hachiji dayo, Zenin Shugo
In 1969, a producer from TBS offered Ikariya and his Drifters a regular spot on a weekly show. Ikariya, once again, was skeptical, having learned a lot the hard way. But this program went on to become one of the most popular shows of its time, Hachiji dayo, Zenin Shugo!. Its low-brow humour and slapstick comedy made it popular for children, much to the dismay of parents at the time. After the show was over in 1985, Ikariya virtually left the Drifters and all members went on to pursue their own goals.

Acting career
After appearing in the 1987 Taiga drama Dokuganryu Masamune, he started his acting career in earnest.
Ikariya had won the public's adoration by then and played a variety of fatherly roles on television and in movies. His part in the drama Odoru Daisōsasen, which later went on to inspire two movies, though, led him to what was the peak in his career - an Academy Award.

In 1990, he appeared in the Akira Kurosawa film Dreams. Ikariya won a Japan Academy Award in 1999 for the film Odoru Daisōsasen / Bayside Shakedown.

Death
Chōsuke Ikariya died on March 20, 2004 at the age of 72 of cancer of the lymph nodes.

Awards and nominations
In 1999, Chōsuke Ikariya won the Japanese Academy Awards of Best Supporting Actor for his performance of Heihachiro Waku in the movie Bayside Shakedown.

Filmography

Movies

Yume wa yoru hiraku (1967) - Apache
Nani wa naku tomo zen'in shûgô!! (1967)
Tenamonya yurei dochu (1967) - Doeman Togashi
Dorifutazu desu yo! Zenshin zenshin matazenshin (1967)Dorifutazu desu yo! Totte totte torimakure (1967)
Dorifutazu desu yo! Bôken bôken mata bôken (1968)
Ii yu dana zenin shûgô!! (1969)
Miyo-chan no tame nara zen'in shûgô!! (1969) - Chôkichi
Dorifutazu desu yo! Zenin totsugeki (1969)
Dorifutazu desu yo! Tokkun tokkun mata tokkun (1969)
Onsen gerira dai shogeki (1970)
Kigeki migimuke hidari! (1970)
Kigeki kinô no teki wa kyô mo teki (1971)
Za.Dorifutazu no kamo da!! Goyo da!! (1975) - Chokichi Ikari
Seigida! Mikatada! Zeninshugo!! (1975) - Chotaro ikari
Dreams (1990) - The crying demon
My Sons (1991) - Jirō Katō
Nagareita shichinin (1997) - Kihachi Mita
Odoru daisosasen – The Movie (1998) - Heihachiro Waku
39 keihô dai sanjûkyû jô (1999) - Patient
Go-Con! Japanese Love Culture (2000) - Chef
Kawa no nagare no yō ni (2000) - Morishita
Shiawase kazoku keikaku (2000) - Yuko's father
Bayside Shakedown 2 (2003) - Heihachiro Waku
My Lover Is a Sniper: The Movie (2004) - Gantaro Endoji (final film role)

TV Dramas
Dokuganryu Masamune (1987) - Oniniwa Yoshinao
Bayside Shakedown (1997, TV Movie) - Heihachiro Waku
When the Saints Go Marching In (1998)
Yomigaeru kinrō (1999) - Mogi
Black Jack II (2000, TV Movie)
Namida o fuite (2000) - Yuichiro Murata
Shiroi Kage (2001) - Yoshizou Ishikura
Gakkō no sensei (2001) - Chochiro asakura
Psycho Doctor (2002) - Famous psychologist
Anata no tonari ni dare ka iru (2003) - Goro Kazuma
Good Luck!! (2003)

References

External links

Official Agency Page 
Short online English biography of the Drifters

1931 births
2004 deaths
Deaths from lymphoma
Japanese bass guitarists
Japanese comedians
Comedians from Tokyo
Male actors from Tokyo
Deaths from cancer in Japan
20th-century Japanese musicians
20th-century bass guitarists
20th-century comedians
20th-century Japanese male actors
21st-century Japanese male actors